The track time trial is a defunct track cycling event formerly held at the Summer Olympics. The event was first held for men at the first modern Olympics in 1896. It was not held again until 1928, when it became a consistent part of the programme and was held every year from then until 2004, after which the event was eliminated. A women's version was added in 2000, being held only twice before being eliminated along with the men's event after 2004. The distance of the time trial was one kilometre for men (except 1896, when it was one-third of a kilometre) and half a kilometre for women.

Medalists

Men

Multiple medalists

Medalists by country

Women

Medalists by country

Olympic record progression

Men

Women

Intercalated Games

The 1906 Intercalated Games were held in Athens and at the time were officially recognised as part of the Olympic Games series, with the intention being to hold a games in Greece in two-year intervals between the internationally held Olympics. However, this plan never came to fruition and the International Olympic Committee (IOC) later decided not to recognise these games as part of the official Olympic series. Some sports historians continue to treat the results of these games as part of the Olympic canon.

Francesco Verri of Italy won the 1906 title, with Herbert Crowther of Great Britain in second and Henri Menjou of France third.

References

Track time trial